Events in the year 1879 in Chile.

Incumbents
President: Aníbal Pinto

Events
March 23 – Battle of Topáter
April 12 – Battle of Chipana
May 21 – Battle of Iquique and Battle of Punta Gruesa
October 8 – Battle of Angamos
November 2 – Battle of Pisagua
November 23 – Battle of San Francisco
November 27 – Battle of Tarapacá

Births
6 February – Pedro Aguirre Cerda, thirtieth president of Chile (d. 1941)
12 February – Juan Esteban Montero, politician (d. 1948)
1 July – Ignacio Urrutia Manzano, politician (d. 1951)

Deaths
May 21 – Arturo Prat, lawyer and navy officer (b. 1848)

See also
War of the Pacific

 
Years of the 19th century in Chile
Chile